Walter Harper (1893 – October 25, 1918) was an Alaska Native mountain climber and guide. On Saturday, 7 June 1913, he was the first person to reach the summit of Denali (Mount McKinley), the highest mountain in North America. He was followed by the other members of the small expedition team, guide Harry Karstens, Episcopal archdeacon Hudson Stuck, who had organized the effort, and Episcopal missionary Robert Tatum.

After gaining more formal education, Harper married in 1918 and planned to go to medical school in Philadelphia. He and his wife took the steamer  from Skagway to Seattle for their honeymoon before setting off cross-country. The ship ran aground on a reef in a snowstorm, and was broken up in a gale, sinking on October 25. All 268 passengers and 75 crew were lost.

Early life and education
The youngest of eight children, Walter Harper was born in 1893 as the son of Jennie Seentahna (née Bosco) Harper, of the Koyukon people from the Koyukuk region, and Arthur Harper, an immigrant from County Antrim, Ireland. They married in 1874 when Harper was 39 and Jennie was 14, at Koyukuk. Harper and his partner Al Mayo founded a trading post in Tanana, near the Athabascan site of Nuklukayet. Harper also did some mining there, after years of experience in California and British Columbia. Mayo married Margaret, a cousin of Jennie.

The couple separated permanently in 1895, and Arthur Harper left the area. He died of tuberculosis in 1897. Jennie reared Walter as traditional Koyukon. All the older Harper children had been sent for education to boarding schools "Outside", mostly in San Francisco, California. Harper's partners also followed this practice for their mixed-race children.

At the age of 16, Walter Harper started going to Tortella School, an Episcopal boarding school associated with St. Marks Mission in Nenana, Alaska. There he met Hudson Stuck, Episcopal archdeacon of the Yukon, who served a large area of the Interior as a missionary. Stuck was impressed by Harper's intelligence, manners, and skills in fishing, tracking, trapping, fire-building, and dog handling. He hired him to work as his interpreter, guide, and dog driver. He also encouraged him to continue with his formal education.

Denali expedition
Stuck invited Harper, then 20, to be part of his 1913 expedition to climb Denali. Others in the party were the chief guide and co-leader Harry Peter Karstens; Robert Tatum, an Episcopal missionary, who served as cook; and two Gwich'in teenagers, Johnny Fredson and Esaias George, who helped prepare and maintain the base camp. This pair also brought the dog teams down when the terrain became too rough for their use.

On March 17, 1913, the expedition left from Nenana to climb Denali. The first day, they hiked  along the Tanana River valley with two sleds of supplies, pulled by fourteen dogs. The  trip up the river to Eureka took eight days; there, they replenished supplies and celebrated Easter.

It took them weeks to reach their final camp. Their journey had been much longer than expected. They had made it through the steep, crevasse-filled Muldrow Glacier; and a tent fire. But it took them three weeks to get through the Karstens Ridge, where the trail was blocked by huge rocks and blocks of ice thrown up by an earthquake the year before. They also survived a  icefall.

At 4:00 a.m. the next morning, the climbers left camp for their final summit push. Harper was the first to gain the summit. They spent an hour and a half on the summit, during which Tatum planted a flag he had made earlier from handkerchiefs. He compared the view to "looking out of a window of heaven." Stuck ensured they also put up a six-foot cross.

After taking readings from their instruments to establish the height of the mountain, the party began the descent. Compared to the 50-day journey up the mountain, it took them just two days to make it back to base camp. The expedition returned to Tanana on June 20, three months and four days since they left.

Later life 
Encouraged by Stuck, at age 21 Harper entered Mount Hermon School where he studied for two years, leaving in 1916. He continued his education in Alaska, while continuing to work on the frontier. He planned to go to medical school in Philadelphia. On September 1, 1918, he married Frances Wells in Fort Yukon, with Archdeacon Stuck officiating. From there, they would travel to Philadelphia, where Harper had been admitted to medical school, and his wife planned to join the Red Cross. They embarked on October 23 at Skagway, and the four-year-old Scottish steamer left at 10:00 that night.

A day later, as the ship was passing through Lynn Canal en route to Juneau, she encountered a strong gale and heavy snow. Initially the sea was calm, but another gale came in. The ship asked by radio for help, but neither ships nor small boats could get close enough to rescue the people aboard because of the dangerous conditions. After about 40 hours, Princess Sophia broke apart and sank on October 25, killing all 268 passengers and 75 crew, a total of 343 persons lost.

After the Harpers' bodies were recovered, the couple was buried side by side in Juneau.

Legacy
In 1913, Stuck named Harper Glacier after the first man to reach the summit. The  glacier runs from Denali Pass on Denali to the Great Icefall before becoming Muldrow Glacier. It was also named for Walter's father Arthur.
On June 7, 2012, the 99th anniversary of the first ascent, Alaskan Senator Lisa Murkowski introduced bill S. 2273, to "designate the Talkeetna Ranger Station in Talkeetna, Alaska, as the Walter Harper Talkeetna Ranger Station."

References

External links
 Walter Harper at peakbagger.com

Koyukon
1893 births
1918 deaths
Accidental deaths in Alaska
Alaskan Athabaskan people
American mountain climbers
Deaths due to shipwreck at sea
Denali
People of pre-statehood Alaska
People from Tanana, Alaska
Burials at Evergreen Cemetery (Juneau, Alaska)